The San Diego Police Department (SDPD) is the primary law enforcement agency for the city of San Diego, California. The department was officially established on May 16, 1889.

History
Prior to the establishment of the San Diego Police Department, law enforcement services were provided by the San Diego City Marshal beginning in 1850. The first City Marshal, Agoston Haraszthy, appointed Richard Freeman a marshal, making Freeman the first African American lawman in California. In 1852, due to lack of willing individuals to take up the position, the City Marshal disbanded.

In 1885 the office of City Marshal was reestablished, and in 1889, with a new city charter, the police department was established. All but one police officer at the time of the establishment were White, except for one Hispanic sergeant. The sixth police chief, Edward Beshyhead, also founded the San Diego Union, a predecessor to the current San Diego Union-Tribune.

In 1939, the department moved into their headquarters on Harbor Drive, which they used until moving to their current building in 1986; in 1998 the former headquarters was placed onto the National Register of Historic Places. During World War II, one third of the department was drafted into the United States Military. In 1973, the first uniformed female officer joined the department.

During the 1980s, the police department was at the center of a case that came before the Supreme Court of the United States and Ninth Circuit, Kolender v. Lawson, 461 U.S. 352 (1983), which held unconstitutional laws that allow police to demand that "loiterers" and "wanderers" provide identification; this continues to affect other departments nationwide. The decade also saw officers responding to the San Ysidro McDonald's massacre; it was also a decade where the department had the highest mortality rate for officers of any major American city.

Misconduct 

On March 12, 1987, a team from the SDPD raided the home of Tommie DuBose, a civil servant working for the U.S. Navy. They were attempting to serve a warrant on his son, Charles. They apparently knocked on the door, then broke it down before anyone inside could open it. After a struggle, Officer Carlos Garcia shot DuBose five times, including four in the back, and he died immediately. An investigation concluded that the uniforms worn did not allow the policemen to be easily identified as law enforcement and that the team did not allow enough time for the family to open the door. The investigation recommended no action be taken against any of the officers. They all returned to duty.

In February 2011, Sergeant Ken Davis was charged with one count of felony stalking and three counts of repeated harassment by phone or electronic contact relating to his conduct towards another police officer. Davis pleaded not guilty and was put on paid administrative duty while on trial. He later pleaded guilty in exchange for a sentence of three years of probation and ten days of community service.

On March 11, 2011, San Diego policeman Anthony Arevalos was arrested on 18 charges related to traffic stops he conducted between 2009 and 2011. He was accused of sexual assault in one instance and for asking women for their underwear in exchange for not being cited. In November, a jury found him guilty of several charges, including felony charges of sexual battery by restraint and assault and battery by an officer. Lawsuits against the city resulted in agreements to pay more than $2 million relating to Arevalos' crimes.

In 2011, Motorcycle Officer Christopher Hall, suspected of DUI after hitting a car and fleeing the scene in Costa Mesa, committed suicide by shooting himself in the head.

In July 2012, Officer Daniel Dana pleaded no contest to committing a lewd act in public, a misdemeanor charge, in exchange with having the felony charge of sexually assaulting a prostitute dropped. It stemmed from a May 2011 event in which Dana coerced a prostitute to have sex with him in his patrol car. Dana left the police force following the charge.

In November 2014, two married SDPD officers, Bryce and Jennifer Charpentier, were arrested for burglarizing homes in the San Diego area. They were trying to steal prescription painkillers to feed their drug addiction. They were both subsequently terminated from SDPD, and sentenced to three years in prison.

On March 15, 2015, at 5:00 a.m., SDPD officers responded to a domestic disturbance call, waking resident Ian Anderson and his six-year-old pit bull service dog, Burberry. Anderson opened the door and informed the officers that they had the wrong address. Video surveillance showed Burberry running up to one of the officers who "put his hand out in an attempt to calm the dog," Burberry then ran towards a second officer who can be seen, in a neighborhood surveillance video, to be retreating. The officer then drew his gun and shot and killed the dog.

On March 17, 2015, a U-T San Diego watchdog reported: "A San Diego Police Department dispatcher and anonymous Wikipedia users have edited or deleted paragraphs from the misconduct section of the police department's Wikipedia page five times since January 2014. ... The edits, which eliminated references to negative information, came as the police force faced several scandals over officer misconduct."

Also on March 17, 2015, a U.S. Department of Justice review recommended that the SDPD overhaul its supervision practices following misconduct in which officers took advantage of women sexually.

In January 2020, Detective Michael Lambert lied to a judge to get a search warrant in a homicide case. The investigation led to the suicide of the suspect and in 2021, a six-million dollar ruling against the department. Lambert later retired.

Rank structure

Line of duty deaths
Since the department's establishment, 36 officers have died in the line of duty.

See also

 Crime in San Diego
 List of law enforcement agencies in California

References

San Diego Police Department Exam & Hiring Police Test Guide

External links

San Diego Police Department
San Diego Police Museum Online

Government of San Diego
Organizations based in San Diego
Municipal police departments of California
1889 establishments in California
Organizations established in 1889